Save the Deli: In Search of Perfect Pastrami, Crusty Rye, and the Heart of Jewish Delicatessen is a book published by Canadian journalist David Sax about the decline of the Jewish delicatessen.

References

External links
 Save the Deli

2009 non-fiction books
American non-fiction books
Books about food and drink
Houghton Mifflin books
Ashkenazi Jewish cuisine